Sandra Achums  is a Nigerian television personality, philanthropist, and most imperative, a veteran actress.

Early life and education
Sandra Achums was born in Imo state which is located in the south-eastern part of the West African nation; Nigeria. She had her primary, secondary and tertiary education all at Lagos State, she attended state college Isolo Lagos.

Career
Achums in 1995 made her entrance into the Nigerian movie industry with a movie titled Deadly Affair, where she featured alongside other nollywood veteran actors; Dolly Unachukwu, Jide Kosoko, and Emeka Ike. The movie would eventually become a classic and become her stepping stone into the limelight. she also was on the remake of Glamour Girls.

Personal life
Achums in 2006 relocated from Nigeria to Germany and currently lives there with her children and her husband who is named Tony.

Sandra Achums, a seasoned actress, gave birth to a boy in Germany. The majority of 90s movies included achums. She has a daughter already. She wrote, "Welcome little baby Ryan to the world" in a post to celebrate the birth of her son.

Selected filmography
Gone Forever (2006)
Circle Of Tears (2004)
Circle Of Tears II (2004)
End Of The Game (2004)
Expensive Game (2004)
Ashanti (2003)
Against The World (2003)
Family Crisis (2003)
Family Crisis II (2003)
Six Problem Girls (2003)
Tears In The Sun (2003)
Outkast (2001)
Oukast II (2002)
Blue Sea (2002)
Tears & Sorrows (2002)
Tears & Sorrows II (2002)
Hatred (2001)
Hatred II (2001)
Hatred III (2001)
Oil Village (2001)
Oil Village II (2001)
The Last Vote (2001)
My Cross (1998)
Deadly Affair (1995)
Deadly Affair II (1998)
Domitila (1996)
Karashika (1996)
Karashika II (1996)

References

External links
 

Living people
1967 births
Nigerian film actresses
Actresses from Imo State
20th-century Nigerian actresses
21st-century Nigerian actresses
Nigerian emigrants to Germany
Igbo actresses
Nigerian television personalities
Nigerian philanthropists
Nigerian humanitarians